Hoplomegistidae is a family of mites in the order Mesostigmata.

Species
Hoplomegistidae contains one genus, with two recognized species:

 Genus Stenosternum Kramer, 1898
 Stenosternum armiger (Berlese, 1888)
 Stenosternum bipilosum Kramer, 1898

References

Mesostigmata
Acari families